B.B.C. Amicale Steesel is a Luxembourgish professional basketball club based in Steinsel. The club is one of the most successful in Luxembourg, as Amicale has won seven national championships.

History 
Founded in 1947, BBC Amicale was the first Luxembourg club with its own clubhouse and private sports hall, where the club was based in 1958. These good structural conditions were not initially reflected in sporting performance and it was only in the early-1970s the club established itself as the top team in the highest Luxembourg Basketball League, winning the championship in 1970-71 and 1972-73. Consequently, BBC Amicale fought mainly against the T71 Dudelange for national supremacy and subject to the first mid-70s. However, Amicale closed the 1977-78 season again as a master from, as well as in 1980 and 1981. With five domestic league titles, Amicale is the fifth most successful basketball team in Luxembourg. In addition, the club won the Luxembourg Cup five times between 1971 and 2015.

Although they could only celebrate championships in the youth section in the recent past, after thirteen years they reached the finals in 2013 for the Championship for Men in which they ran against defending champion T71 Dudelange.

Better-known players who played in the German Basketball League, were the Estonian national player Margus Metstak and the Czech international player Kamil Novák. In the league finals in 2013 including the Americans Reggie Golson and the Luxembourg national player Samy Picard were members of the squad.

Honours 

Luxembourgian League
 Winners (9): 1970-71, 1972–73, 1977–78, 1979–80, 1980–81, 2015–16, 2016–17, 2017-18, 2021-22
Luxembourgian Cup
 Winners (7): 1970-71, 1977–78, 1978–79, 1979–80, 2014–15, 2016–17, 2017–18

Notable players

 Alex Laurent
 Margus Metstak

Head coaches 
 Dragoş Nosievici

External links 

 Amicale Steesel – Homepage 
 BBC Amicale auf den Seiten von flbb.lu 
 Amicale Steinsel basketball – team details, stats, news, roster – Profil auf den Webseiten von Eurobasket.com 
 Women BBC Amicale at Eurobasket.com

Basketball teams established in 1947
Basketball teams in Luxembourg